Croatian Quality is a label awarded by the Croatian Chamber of Economy to companies on Croatian territory which produce material and service of only the highest quality. This label can be applied to some of the following Croatian brands.

References 

Croatia
Economy of Croatia
Croatian brands